Auximella is a genus of South American tangled nest spiders first described by Embrik Strand in 1908.

Species
 it contains six species:
Auximella harpagula (Simon, 1906) – Ecuador
Auximella minensis (Mello-Leitão, 1926) – Brazil
Auximella producta (Chamberlin, 1916) – Peru
Auximella spinosa (Mello-Leitão, 1926) – Brazil
Auximella subdifficilis (Mello-Leitão, 1920) – Brazil
Auximella typica Strand, 1908 – Peru

References

External links

Amaurobiidae
Araneomorphae genera
Spiders of South America
Taxa named by Embrik Strand